Metropolitan Bank may refer to:

Habib Metropolitan Bank, Pakistan
Metropolitan Bank and Trust Company, Philippines
Metropolitan Bank (Chicago), a bank in Chicago
Metropolitan Bank of Zimbabwe, a commercial bank in Zimbabwe
Metropolitan Bank (of England and Wales), a bank in England and Wales from 1893 to 1914